Bungku is an Austronesian language (one of the Celebic languages) of Southeast Sulawesi, Indonesia. It is quite close to Wawonii. It was a local lingua franca before independence.

References

Further reading
Mead, David. 1998. Proto-Bungku-Tolaki: Reconstruction of its phonology and aspects of its morphosyntax. PhD dissertation. Houston: Rice University.
Mead, David. 1999. The Bungku–Tolaki languages of south-eastern Sulawesi, Indonesia. Series D-91. Canberra: Pacific Linguistics.

Bungku–Tolaki languages
Languages of Sulawesi